Salvatore Inzerillo (20 August 1944 – 11 May 1981) was an Italian member of the Sicilian Mafia, also known as Totuccio (a diminutive for Salvatore). He rose to be a powerful boss of Palermo's Passo di Rigano family. A prolific heroin trafficker, he was killed in May 1981 by the Corleonesi of Totò Riina in the Second Mafia War who opposed the established Palermo Mafia families of which Inzerillo was one of the main proponents.

Early life
Inzerillo was born in Palermo. He married his cousin, Giuseppa Di Maggio, the daughter of his mother's brother, Rosario Di Maggiothe boss of the Passo di Rigano Mafia family. Through a string of marriages the Inzerillos were related to the Di Maggio and Spatola families in Palermo and the Gambinos in New York. He had two sons, Giuseppe and Giovanni.

Inzerillo was a close ally of Stefano Bontade and Gaetano Badalamenti and a relative of the New York City Mafia boss Carlo Gambino. He became a member of the Sicilian Mafia Commission in 1978, succeeding his uncle Rosario Di Maggio, and formed a strong alliance with Bontade against the growing power of Totò Riina and the Corleonesi who were increasingly challenging the established Mafia families of Palermo.

Killed in the Second Mafia War

Salvatore Inzerillo ordered the killing of prosecuting judge Gaetano Costa who signed the 53 arrest warrants against the Spatola-Inzerillo-Gambino clan and their heroin-trafficking network in May 1980. Costa was murdered on August 6, 1980. Inzerillo acted without asking permission from the Mafia Commission to prove he could commit a murder in rival territory (that of Giuseppe Calò) just as the Corleonesi.

On 11 May 1981, Inzerillo was gunned down in Palermo as he strolled towards his recently acquired bullet-proof car after leaving the house of his mistress. He was rendered almost unrecognizable by a hail of bullets from a machine gun. The firearm used was an AK-47, the same gun that killed Bontade the previous month. The deaths of these two powerful mafiosi kick-started the Second Mafia War that lasted almost two-years and saw hundreds of mafiosi killed as Totò Riina and the Corleonesi decimated their rivals in order to take over Cosa Nostra by sheer brute force.

It is believed Inzerillo was murdered by Pino Greco, one of Riina's most lethal hitmen. At Inzerillo's funeral, his teenage son Giuseppe vowed to avenge his father, and not long afterwards the boy was kidnapped, tortured and killed. A number of informants, including Tommaso Buscetta, said that it was Pino Greco who abducted the youth and shot him through the head, but first hacked his arm off, symbolically removing the arm the youngster had vowed to shoot Riina with.

Santo Inzerillo, the brother of Salvatore, was strangled on 26 May 1981, when he came to a meeting to ask clarifications about the killing of his relatives. One of the other brothers, Pietro Inzerillo subsequently turned up murdered in New Jersey, also in 1981.

References

Sources
Arlacchi, Pino (1988). Mafia Business. The Mafia Ethic and the Spirit of Capitalism, Oxford: Oxford University Press 
Jamieson, Alison (2000), The Antimafia. Italy’s Fight Against Organized Crime, London: MacMillan Press 
Paoli, Letizia (2003). Mafia Brotherhoods: Organized Crime, Italian Style, Oxford/New York: Oxford University Press 
Shawcross, Tim & Martin Young (1987). Men Of Honour: The Confessions Of Tommaso Buscetta, Glasgow: Collins 
Sterling, Claire (1990), Octopus. How the long reach of the Sicilian Mafia controls the global narcotics trade, New York: Simon & Schuster, 
Stille, Alexander (1995). Excellent Cadavers. The Mafia and the Death of the First Italian Republic, New York: Vintage 

1944 births
1981 deaths
Gangsters from Palermo
Mafiosi murdered by the Corleonesi
Sicilian Mafia Commission
Inzerillo-Gambino Mafia clan
Italian drug traffickers
People murdered in Italy